George M. Browning Jr. (born November 22, 1928) is a retired lieutenant general in the United States Air Force who served as Comptroller of the United States Air Force from 1981 to 1984. He was commissioned through ROTC at the University of California, Los Angeles in 1952.

References

1928 births
Living people
United States Air Force generals